2009 Gomelsky Cup tournament was held from October 2 till October 3, 2009. Four European teams competed against each other for the Gomelsky Cup title.

Participants
  CSKA Moscow – host team
  Panathinaikos Athens – Euroleague 2008–09 champion
  Lietuvos Rytas Vilnius – ULEB Cup 2008-09 champion
  Triumph Lyubertsy – EuroChallenge 2008-09 semi-finalist

Competition

2009
2009–10 in Russian basketball
2009–10 in Lithuanian basketball
2009–10 in Greek basketball